New Jersey's 23rd Legislative District is one of 40 in the New Jersey Legislature. As of the 2011 apportionment, the district includes the Hunterdon County municipalities of Alexandria Township, Bethlehem Township, Bloomsbury, Califon, Clinton Town, Clinton Township, Franklin Township, Frenchtown, Glen Gardner, Hampton, High Bridge, Holland Township, Kingwood Township, Lebanon Borough, Lebanon Township, Milford, Tewksbury Township and Union Township, the Somerset County municipalities of Bedminster Township, Bound Brook, Bridgewater Township, Peapack-Gladstone, Raritan and South Bound Brook, and the Warren County municipalities of Alpha, Franklin Township, Greenwich Township, Hackettstown Town, Harmony Township, Lopatcong Township, Mansfield Township, Phillipsburg Town, Pohatcong Township, Washington Borough and Washington Township.

Demographic characteristics
As of the 2020 United States census, the district had a population of 222,231, of whom 177,008 (79.7%) were of voting age. The racial makeup of the district was 160,381 (72.2%) White, 10,593 (4.8%) African American, 630 (0.3%) Native American, 19,106 (8.6%) Asian, 56 (0.0%) Pacific Islander, 12,743 (5.7%) from some other race, and 18,722 (8.4%) from two or more races. Hispanic or Latino of any race were 29,551 (13.3%) of the population. 

The 23rd District had 174,110 registered voters as of December 1, 2021, of whom 61,978 (35.6%) were registered as unaffiliated, 61,046 (35.1%) were registered as Republicans, 49,004 (28.1%) were registered as Democrats, and 2,082 (1.2%) were registered to other parties.

As of 2000, the district had the largest population of any in the state and the second-highest land area, making it one of the least densely populated districts in the state. The district had a small minority population, with comparatively few African American, Asian and Hispanic residents. The district had the highest municipal tax rate in the state, but lower than average school and county taxes leave the overall rate near the statewide median. Registered Republicans outnumber Democrats by a 2-1 margin.

Political representation
For the 2022–2023 session, the district is represented in the State Senate by Doug Steinhardt (R), Lopatcong Township) and in the General Assembly by John DiMaio (R, Hackettstown) and Erik Peterson (R, Franklin Township, Hunterdon County).

The legislative district overlaps with 7th and 12th congressional districts.

District composition since 1973
Upon the creation of the 40-district legislative map in 1973, the 23rd District consisted of central Morris County including Madison, Morristown, Dover, and Town and Township of Boonton. Following the 1981 redistricting, the 23rd shifted to the rural areas of western New Jersey including the Borough and Township of Hopewell and Pennington in Mercer County, all of Hunterdon County except East Amwell Township, in Warren County Franklin Township, Greenwich Township, and the Borough and Township of Washington, western Morris County, and Stanhope in Sussex County. For the 1991 redistricting following the 1990 Census, the district shifted to most of Hunterdon County except for some municipalities in the northern part of the county, all of Warren County, and the Mercer County portion remaining unchanged.

In the 2001 redistricting, the Mercer County municipalities were eliminated from the 23rd with the district only consisting of Hunterdon County save for Tewksbury Township and Califon and all of Warren County. The district experienced a major change following the 2011 redistricting; the 23rd currently consists of southern Warren County including Phillipsburg, Washington, and Hackettstown, most of northern Hunterdon County, and a spur into Somerset County with Bedminster, Peapack-Gladstone, Bridgewater, Raritan Borough, Bound Brook, and South Bound Brook.

Despite the historic Republican nature of Morris County, Democrats swept the three legislative seats up for election in 1973: Stephen B. Wiley, who was also elected in a special election to complete an unexpired Senate term under the old at-large Morris County district, was elected to a four-year Senate term from this district, Gordon MacInnes and Rosemarie Totaro won both Assembly seats as well. MacInnes and Totaro would both be defeated for re-election in 1975 but Totaro would again serve one term in the Assembly after winning in 1977 and MacInnes would later serve four years in the Senate from the geographically similar 25th District in 1993. Governor of New Jersey Brendan Byrne nominated State Senator Wiley to the New Jersey Supreme Court in 1977, his nomination was approved by the Senate, but was rejected by the Supreme Court, which ruled that as Wiley had voted to raise the salary of justices of the Supreme Court in 1974, he could not be appointed to serve on the court until after his term of office expired. Wiley served the remainder of his term in the Senate but was defeated for re-election in 1977 by Republican John H. Dorsey.

After the 1981 redistricting, Senator Walter E. Foran and Assemblyman Karl Weidel, who had been elected from the 14th District in the previous election, became representatives from the 23rd. Following the death of Foran in 1986, Dick Zimmer filled the vacant seat in the Senate and William E. Schluter won Zimmer's Assembly seat, and then continued on to the State Senate after Zimmer succeeded Jim Courter in the United States House of Representatives in 1991. Schluter's Assembly seat was filled by Leonard Lance.

On January 24, 2009, a special election was held by a convention of Republican committee members from Hunterdon and Warren counties to fill the Senate vacancy created when Leonard Lance was elected to Congress. Marcia A. Karrow defeated Michael J. Doherty in the special election by a margin of 195 votes to 143. Doherty announced he would run against Karrow a second time in the June 2009 primary, when she would be running as the incumbent. The Hunterdon and Warren County Republican committee members held another special convention on February 21, 2009 to fill Karrow's vacant Assembly seat. In the contest, Warren County Freeholder John DiMaio defeated Hunterdon County Freeholders Matt Holt and Erik Peterson.

On June 2, 2009, Doherty defeated Karrow in the Republican Senate primary by a margin of 52%-48%, making her the only incumbent to lose a primary battle that year.  Doherty went on to win the November special election, defeating Democratic candidate Harvey Baron to fill the remaining two years of the term. Karrow's Senate term ended on November 23, 2009 when Doherty was sworn into office.

Doug Steinhardt took office on December 19, 2022, succeeding Michael J. Doherty, who resigned to take the position as Warren County Surrigate.

Election history
Senators and Assembly members elected from the district are as follows:

Election results

Senate

General Assembly

References

Hunterdon County, New Jersey
Somerset County, New Jersey
Warren County, New Jersey
23